Sunney Ignatius Chan (born October 5, 1936) is an American-born biophysical chemist. His work primarily focused on the use of various magnetic resonance spectroscopic and other physical chemical techniques in the analysis of various biochemical and biological problems.

Early life and education
He was born on October 5, 1936, in San Francisco to immigrant parents originally from Southern China. Chan received secondary education in Hong Kong, returning to the United States to attend the University of San Francisco. Shortly afterwards, he transferred to the University of California, Berkeley, where he earned a bachelor's and doctoral degree in chemistry. He completed his doctoral work under the supervision of physical chemist William Dulaney Gwinn and was awarded his PhD in 1961.

Career
After receiving his doctorate, Chan completed a one-year post-doctoral fellowship in the laboratory of the Nobel laurate physicist Norman Ramsey at Harvard University and later returned to California to join the chemistry faculty at University of California, Riverside. He began teaching at the California Institute of Technology in 1963. Five years later, he was awarded a Guggenheim fellowship. Chan received several honors throughout his career at Caltech, among them fellowship into the American Physical Society (1987) and American Association for the Advancement of Science (1992), as well as membership of Academia Sinica (1988). He was appointed Caltech's first George Grant Hoag Professor of Biophysical Chemistry in 1992. Chan retired from Caltech in 1997, for a position as distinguished research fellow at Academia Sinica. Subsequently, Chan was named vice president of Academia Sinica under Yuan T. Lee. Caltech granted emeritus status to Chan in 2002. Upon Chan's retirement as vice president of Academia Sinica in July 2003, Lee inaugurated the Sunney Chan Lecture in Chan's honor. He remained affiliated with Academia Sinica as a research and visiting fellow until 2015. In his later career, Chan has held distinguished chair and research professorships at National Taiwan University and National Chung Hsing University.

References

Scientists from the San Francisco Bay Area
1936 births
Living people
Members of Academia Sinica
Fellows of the American Physical Society
University of California, Riverside faculty
University of San Francisco alumni
UC Berkeley College of Chemistry alumni
Academic staff of the National Taiwan University
Academic staff of the National Chung Hsing University
Fellows of the American Association for the Advancement of Science
American people of Chinese descent
TWAS fellows
American expatriates in Hong Kong
American expatriate academics
American expatriates in Taiwan
20th-century American chemists
21st-century American chemists